This is a comprehensive listing of bird species recorded in Biscayne National Park, which is in the U.S. state of Florida. This list is based on one published by the National Park Service (NPS) with species confirmed through December 21, 2017. The list contains 213 species, of which 12 are accidental and eight have been introduced (see below). With one exception, introduced species recorded in the Park that do not have established populations according to the Florida Ornithological Society Records Committee (FOSRC) are not included here.

This list is presented in the taxonomic sequence of the Check-list of North and Middle American Birds, 7th edition through the 63rd Supplement, published by the American Ornithological Society (AOS). Common and scientific names are also those of the Check-list, except that the common names of families are from the Clements taxonomy because the AOS list does not include them.

The following status codes have been used to annotate some species:

(A) Accidental - a species that occurs rarely or accidentally in Florida, and for which the FOSRC requests a full report for verification
(I) Introduced - a species that has been introduced to North America by the actions of humans, either directly or indirectly, and has become established in Florida

Ducks, geese, and waterfowl

Order: AnseriformesFamily: Anatidae

The family Anatidae includes the ducks and most duck-like waterfowl, such as geese and swans. These birds are adapted to an aquatic existence with webbed feet, flattened bills, and feathers that are excellent at shedding water due to special oils.

Fulvous whistling-duck, Dendrocygna bicolor
Snow goose, Anser caerulescens
Brant, Branta bernicla (A)
Mute swan, Cygnus olor (I) (not on the FOS list)
Muscovy duck, Cairina moschata (I)
Blue-winged teal, Spatula discors
American wigeon, Mareca americana
Mottled duck, Anas fulvigula
Northern pintail, Anas acuta
Canvasback, Aythya valisineria
Lesser scaup, Aythya affinis
White-winged scoter, Melanitta deglandi
Black scoter, Melanitta americana
Bufflehead, Bucephala albeola
Hooded merganser, Lophodytes cucullatus
Red-breasted merganser, Mergus serrator

Flamingoes
Order: PhoenicopteriformesFamily: Phoenicopteridae

Flamingos filter-feed on shellfish and algae. Their oddly shaped beaks are adapted to separate mud and silt from the food they consume and, uniquely, are used upside-down.

American flamingo, Phoenicopterus ruber

Grebes

Order: PodicipediformesFamily: Podicipedidae

Grebes are small to medium-large freshwater diving birds. They have lobed toes and are excellent swimmers and divers. However, they have their feet placed far back on the body, making them quite ungainly on land.

Pied-billed grebe, Podilymbus podiceps
Horned grebe, Podiceps auritus

Pigeons and doves

Order: ColumbiformesFamily: Columbidae

Pigeons and doves are stout-bodied birds with short necks, and short slender bills with a fleshy cere.

Rock pigeon, Columba livia (I)
White-crowned pigeon, Patagioenas leucocephala
Eurasian collared-dove, Streptopelia decaocto (I)
Common ground dove, Columbina passerina
Key West quail-dove, Geotrygon chrysia (A)
White-winged dove, Zenaida asiatica
Mourning dove, Zenaida macroura

Cuckoos

Order: CuculiformesFamily: Cuculidae

The family Cuculidae includes cuckoos, roadrunners, and anis. These birds are of variable size with slender bodies, long tails, and strong legs.

Smooth-billed ani, Crotophaga ani 
Yellow-billed cuckoo, Coccyzus americanus
Mangrove cuckoo, Coccyzus minor
Black-billed cuckoo, Coccyzus erythropthalmus

Nightjars and allies

Order: CaprimulgiformesFamily: Caprimulgidae

Nightjars are medium-sized nocturnal birds that usually nest on the ground. They have long wings, short legs, and very short bills. Most have small feet, of little use for walking, and long pointed wings. Their soft plumage is cryptically colored to resemble bark or leaves.

Common nighthawk, Chordeiles minor
Chuck-will's-widow, Antrostomus carolinensis
Eastern whip-poor-will, Antrostomus vociferus

Hummingbirds

Order: ApodiformesFamily: Trochilidae

Hummingbirds are small birds capable of hovering in mid-air due to the rapid flapping of their wings. They are the only birds that can fly backwards.

Ruby-throated hummingbird, Archilochus colubris

Rails, gallinules, and coots
Order: GruiformesFamily: Rallidae

The Rallidae is a large family of small to medium-sized birds which includes the rails, crakes, coots, and gallinules. The most typical family members occupy dense vegetation in damp environments near lakes, swamps, or rivers. In general they are shy and secretive, making them difficult to observe. Most have strong legs with long toes, short rounded wings, and are weak fliers.

Clapper rail, Rallus crepitans
Common gallinule, Gallinula galeata
American coot, Fulica americana

Stilts and avocets
Order: CharadriiformesFamily: Recurvirostridae

Recurvirostridae is a family of large wading birds which includes the avocets and stilts. The avocets have long legs and long up-curved bills. The stilts have extremely long legs and long, thin, straight bills.

Black-necked stilt, Himantopus mexicanus
American avocet, Recurvirostra americana

Oystercatchers
Order: CharadriiformesFamily: Haematopodidae

The oystercatchers are large, conspicuous, and noisy plover-like birds, with strong bills used for smashing or prising open molluscs.

American oystercatcher, Haematopus palliatus

Plovers and lapwings
Order: CharadriiformesFamily: Charadriidae

The family Charadriidae includes the plovers, dotterels, and lapwings. They are small to medium-sized birds with compact bodies, short thick necks, and long, usually pointed, wings. They are generally found in open country, mostly in habitats near water.

Black-bellied plover, Pluvialis squatarola
Killdeer, Charadrius vociferus
Semipalmated plover, Charadrius semipalmatus
Piping plover, Charadrius melodus
Wilson's plover, Charadrius wilsonia

Sandpipers and allies

Order: CharadriiformesFamily: Scolopacidae

Scolopacidae is a large and diverse family of small to medium-sized shorebirds which includes the sandpipers, curlews, godwits, shanks, tattlers, woodcocks, snipes, dowitchers, and phalaropes. Most eat small invertebrates picked out of the mud or sand. Different lengths of legs and bills enable multiple species to feed in the same habitat, particularly on the coast, without direct competition for food.

Whimbrel, Numenius phaeopus
Ruddy turnstone, Arenaria interpres
Red knot, Calidris canutus
Sanderling, Calidris alba
Dunlin, Calidris alpina
Purple sandpiper, Calidris maritima
Least sandpiper, Calidris minutilla
Semipalmated sandpiper, Calidris pusilla
Western sandpiper, Calidris mauri
Short-billed dowitcher, Limnodromus griseus
Wilson's snipe, Gallinago delicata
Spotted sandpiper, Actitis macularius
Solitary sandpiper, Tringa solitaria
Lesser yellowlegs, Tringa flavipes
Willet, Tringa semipalmata
Greater yellowlegs, Tringa melanoleuca
Red-necked phalarope, Phalaropus lobatus
Red phalarope, Phalaropus fulicarius

Skuas and jaegers

Order: CharadriiformesFamily: Stercorariidae

Skuas are medium to large seabirds, typically with gray or brown plumage, often with white markings on the wings. They have longish bills with hooked tips and webbed feet with sharp claws. They look like large dark gulls, but have a fleshy cere above the upper mandible. They are strong, acrobatic fliers.

Pomarine jaeger, Stercorarius pomarinus
Parasitic jaeger, Stercorarius parasiticus

Gulls, terns, and skimmers

Order: CharadriiformesFamily: Laridae

The Laridae are a family of medium to large seabirds and containing the gulls, terns, kittiwakes, and skimmers. They are typically gray or white, often with black markings on the head or wings. They have stout, longish bills and webbed feet.

Bonaparte's gull, Chroicocephalus philadelphia
Laughing gull, Leucophaeus atricilla
Franklin's gull, Leucophaeus pipixcan
Ring-billed gull, Larus delawarensis
Herring gull, Larus argentatus
Lesser black-backed gull, Larus fuscus
Glaucous gull, Larus hyperboreus
Great black-backed gull, Larus marinus
Brown noddy, Anous stolidus
Sooty tern, Onychoprion fuscata
Least tern, Sternula antillarum
Caspian tern, Hydroprogne caspia
Black tern, Chlidonias niger
Common tern, Sterna hirundo
Arctic tern, Sterna paradisaea
Forster's tern, Sterna forsteri
Royal tern, Thalasseus maxima
Sandwich tern, Thalasseus sandvicensis
Black skimmer, Rynchops niger

Tropicbirds
Order: PhaethontiformesFamily: Phaethontidae

Tropicbirds are slender white birds of tropical oceans with exceptionally long central tail feathers. Their long wings have black markings, as does the head.

Red-billed tropicbird, Phaeton aethereus (A)

Loons
Order: GaviiformesFamily: Gaviidae

Loons are aquatic birds the size of a large duck, to which they are unrelated. Their plumage is largely gray or black and they have spear-shaped bills. Loons swim well and fly adequately but, because their legs are placed towards the rear of the body, are clumsy on land.

Red-throated loon, Gavia stellata
Common loon, Gavia immer

Southern storm-petrels
Order: ProcellariiformesFamily: Oceanitidae

The storm-petrels are the smallest seabirds, relatives of the petrels, feeding on planktonic crustaceans and small fish picked from the ocean's surface, typically while hovering. The flight is fluttering and sometimes bat-like.

Wilson's storm-petrel, Oceanites oceanicus

Shearwaters and petrels
Order: ProcellariiformesFamily: Procellariidae

The procellariids are the main group of medium-sized "true petrels", characterized by united tubular nostrils with a median septum.

Audubon's shearwater, Puffinus lherminieri

Storks

Order: CiconiiformesFamily: Ciconiidae

Storks are large, heavy, long-legged, long-necked wading birds with long stout bills and wide wingspans. They lack the powder down that other wading birds such as herons, spoonbills and ibises use to clean off fish slime. Storks lack a pharynx and are mute.

Wood stork, Mycteria americana

Frigatebirds
Order: SuliformesFamily: Fregatidae

Frigatebirds are large seabirds usually found over tropical oceans. They are large, black, or black-and-white, with long wings and deeply forked tails. The males have colored inflatable throat pouches. They do not swim or walk and cannot take off from a flat surface. Having the largest wingspan-to-body-weight ratio of any bird, they are essentially aerial, able to stay aloft for more than a week.

Magnificent frigatebird, Fregata magnificens

Boobies and gannets

Order: SuliformesFamily: Sulidae

The sulids comprise the gannets and boobies. Both groups are medium-large coastal seabirds that plunge-dive for fish.

Brown booby, Sula leucogaster
Red-footed booby, Sula sula (A)
Northern gannet, Morus bassanus

Anhingas

Order: SuliformesFamily: Anhingidae

Anhingas, also known as darters or snakebirds, are cormorant-like water birds with long necks and long, straight beaks. They are fish eaters, diving for long periods, and often swim with only their neck above the water, looking rather like a water snake.

Anhinga, Anhinga anhinga

Cormorants and shags
Order: SuliformesFamily: Phalacrocoracidae

Cormorants are medium-to-large aquatic birds, usually with mainly dark plumage and areas of colored skin on the face. The bill is long, thin, and sharply hooked. Their feet are four-toed and webbed.

Double-crested cormorant, Nannopterum auritum

Pelicans

Order: PelecaniformesFamily: Pelecanidae

Pelicans are very large water birds with a distinctive pouch under their beak. Like other birds in the order Pelecaniformes, they have four webbed toes.

American white pelican, Pelecanus erythrorhynchos
Brown pelican, Pelecanus occidentalis

Herons, egrets, and bitterns

Order: PelecaniformesFamily: Ardeidae

The family Ardeidae contains the herons, egrets, and bitterns. Herons and egrets are wading birds with long necks and legs. Herons are large and egrets are smaller. The cattle egret or "cow bird" is seen amongst flocks of cattle, for instance in ranches north of the Everglades. A bird will often attach itself to a particular bull, cow or calf, even being tolerated perching on the back or even the head of the animal. The birds are more shy than the animals, and will fly away if approached. The birds feed on various items turned over by the cattle as they graze and tramp the ground. Bitterns tend to be shorter necked and more secretive. Unlike other long-necked birds such as storks, ibises, and spoonbills, members of the Ardeidae fly with their necks pulled back into a curve.

Great blue heron, Ardea herodias
Great egret, Ardea alba
Snowy egret, Egretta thula
Little blue heron, Egretta caerulea
Tricolored heron, Egretta tricolor
Reddish egret, Egretta rufescens
Cattle egret, Bubulcus ibis
Green heron, Butorides virescens
Black-crowned night-heron, Nycticorax nycticorax
Yellow-crowned night-heron, Nyctanassa violacea

Ibises and spoonbills
Order: PelecaniformesFamily: Threskiornithidae

The family Threskiornithidae includes the ibises and spoonbills. They have long, broad wings. Their bodies are elongated, the neck more so, with long legs. The bill is also long, curved downward in the ibises, straight and markedly flattened in the spoonbills.

White ibis, Eudocimus albus
Glossy ibis, Plegadis falcinellus
Roseate spoonbill, Platalea ajaja

New World vultures
Order: CathartiformesFamily: Cathartidae

New World vultures are not closely related to Old World vultures, but superficially resemble them because of convergent evolution. Like the Old World vultures, they are scavengers. Unlike Old World vultures, which find carcasses by sight, New World vultures have a good sense of smell with which they locate carcasses.

Black vulture, Coragyps atratus
Turkey vulture, Cathartes aura

Osprey
Order: AccipitriformesFamily: Pandionidae

Pandionidae is a family of fish-eating birds of prey possessing a very large, powerful hooked beak for tearing flesh from their prey, strong legs, powerful talons, and keen eyesight. The family is monotypic.

Osprey, Pandion haliaetus

Hawks, eagles, and kites

Order: AccipitriformesFamily: Accipitridae

Accipitridae is a family of birds of prey that includes hawks, eagles, kites, harriers, and Old World vultures. They have very large, hooked beaks for tearing flesh from their prey, strong legs, powerful talons, and keen eyesight.

Northern harrier, Circus hudsonius
Sharp-shinned hawk, Accipiter striatus
Cooper's hawk, Accipiter cooperii
Bald eagle, Haliaeetus leucocephalus
Snail kite, Rostrhamus sociabilis
Red-shouldered hawk, Buteo lineatus
Broad-winged hawk, Buteo platypterus
Short-tailed hawk, Buteo brachyurus
Red-tailed hawk, Buteo jamaicensis

Barn-owls
Order: StrigiformesFamily: Tytonidae

Barn-owls are medium to large owls with large heads and characteristic heart-shaped faces. They have long strong legs with powerful talons.

Barn owl, Tyto alba

Owls
Order: StrigiformesFamily: Strigidae

Typical owls are small to large solitary nocturnal birds of prey. They have large forward-facing eyes and ears, a hawk-like beak, and a conspicuous circle of feathers around each eye called a facial disk.

Eastern screech-owl, Megascops asio
Great horned owl, Bubo virginianus
Barred owl, Strix varia

Kingfishers
Order: CoraciiformesFamily: Alcedinidae

Kingfishers are medium-sized birds with large heads, long pointed bills, short legs, and stubby tails.

Belted kingfisher, Megaceryle alcyon

Woodpeckers

Order: PiciformesFamily: Picidae

Woodpeckers are small to medium-sized birds with chisel-like beaks, short legs, stiff tails, and long tongues used for capturing insects. Some species have feet with two toes pointing forward and two backward, while several species have only three toes. Many woodpeckers have the habit of tapping noisily on tree trunks with their beaks.

Red-bellied woodpecker, Melanerpes carolinus
Yellow-bellied sapsucker, Sphyrapicus varius
Downy woodpecker, Dryobates pubescens
Northern flicker, Colaptes auratus
Pileated woodpecker, Dryocopus pileatus

Falcons and caracaras
Order: FalconiformesFamily: Falconidae

The Falconidae is a family of diurnal birds of prey containing the falcons and caracaras. They differ from hawks, eagles, and kites in that they kill with their beaks instead of their talons.

American kestrel, Falco sparverius
Merlin, Falco columbarius
Peregrine falcon, Falco peregrinus

New World and African parrots
Order: PsittaciformesFamily: Psittacidae

Characteristic features of parrots include a strong curved bill, an upright stance, strong legs, and clawed zygodactyl feet. Many parrots are vividly colored, and some are multi-colored. Most of the more than 150 species in this family are found in the New World.

Monk parakeet, Myiopsitta monachus (I)

Tyrant flycatchers

Order: PasseriformesFamily: Tyrannidae

Tyrant flycatchers are passerines which occur throughout North and South America. They superficially resemble the Old World flycatchers, but are more robust and have stronger bills. They do not have the sophisticated vocal capabilities of the songbirds. Most, but not all, are rather plain. As the name implies, most are insectivorous.

Great crested flycatcher, Myiarchus crinitus
La Sagra's flycatcher, Myiarchus sagrae (A)
Western kingbird, Tyrannus verticalis
Gray kingbird, Tyrannus dominicensis
Eastern wood-pewee, Contopus virens
Eastern phoebe, Sayornis phoebe

Vireos, shrike-babblers, and erpornis
Order: PasseriformesFamily: Vireonidae

The vireos are a group of small to medium-sized passerines restricted to the New World. They are typically greenish in color and resemble wood warblers apart from their heavier bills.

White-eyed vireo, Vireo griseus
Bell's vireo, Vireo bellii
Yellow-throated vireo, Vireo flavifrons
Red-eyed vireo, Vireo olivaceus
Black-whiskered vireo, Vireo altiloquus

Shrikes
Order: PasseriformesFamily: Laniidae

Shrikes are passerines known for their habit of catching other birds and small animals and impaling the uneaten portions of their bodies on thorns. A shrike's beak is hooked, like that of a typical bird of prey.

Loggerhead shrike, Lanius ludovicianus

Crows, jays, and magpies

Order: PasseriformesFamily: Corvidae

The family Corvidae includes crows, ravens, jays, choughs, magpies, treepies, nutcrackers, and ground jays. Corvids are above average in size among the Passeriformes and some of the larger species show high levels of intelligence.

Blue jay, Cyanocitta cristata
American crow, Corvus brachyrhynchos
Fish crow, Corvus ossifragus

Swallows

Order: PasseriformesFamily: Hirundinidae

The family Hirundinidae is adapted to aerial feeding. They have a slender streamlined body, long pointed wings, and a short bill with a wide gape. The feet are adapted to perching rather than walking, and the front toes are partly joined at the base.

Tree swallow, Tachycineta bicolor
Northern rough-winged swallow, Stelgidopteryx serripennis
Purple martin, Progne subis
Barn swallow, Hirundo rustica

Kinglets
Order: PasseriformesFamily: Regulidae

The kinglets are a small family of birds which resemble the titmice. They are very small insectivorous birds in the genus Regulus. The adults have colored crowns, giving rise to their name.

Ruby-crowned kinglet, Corthylio calendula

Waxwings
Order: PasseriformesFamily: Bombycillidae

The waxwings are a group of birds with soft silky plumage and unique red tips to some of the wing feathers. In the Bohemian and cedar waxwings, these tips look like sealing wax and give the group its name. These are arboreal birds of northern forests. They live on insects in summer and berries in winter.

Cedar waxwing, Bombycilla cedrorum

Gnatcatchers
Order: PasseriformesFamily: Polioptilidae

The family Polioptilidae is a group of small insectivorous passerine birds containing the gnatcatchers and gnatwrens.

Blue-gray gnatcatcher, Polioptila caerulea

Wrens

Order: PasseriformesFamily: Troglodytidae

Wrens are small and inconspicuous birds, except for their loud songs. They have short wings and thin down-turned bills. Several species often hold their tails upright. All are insectivorous.

Carolina wren, Thryothorus ludovicianus
House wren, Troglodytes aedon

Mockingbirds and thrashers

Order: PasseriformesFamily: Mimidae

The mimids are a family of passerine birds which includes thrashers, mockingbirds, tremblers, and the New World catbirds. They are notable for their vocalization, especially their remarkable ability to mimic a wide variety of birds and other sounds heard outdoors. The species tend towards dull grays and browns in their appearance.

Gray catbird, Dumetella carolinensis
Brown thrasher, Toxostoma rufum
Bahama mockingbird, Mimus gundlachii (A)
Northern mockingbird, Mimus polyglottos

Starlings
Order: PasseriformesFamily: Sturnidae

Starlings are small to medium-sized passerines with strong feet. Their flight is strong and direct and they are very gregarious. Their preferred habitat is open country, and they eat insects and fruit. Their plumage is typically dark with a metallic sheen.

European starling, Sturnus vulgaris (I)
Common myna, Acridotheres tristis (I)

Thrushes and allies

Order: PasseriformesFamily: Turdidae

The thrushes are a group of passerine birds that occur mainly but not exclusively in the Old World. They are plump, soft plumaged, small to medium-sized insectivores or sometimes omnivores, often feeding on the ground. Many have attractive songs.

Veery, Catharus fuscescens
Gray-cheeked thrush, Catharus minimus
Swainson's thrush, Catharus ustulatus
American robin, Turdus migratorius

Old World sparrows
Order: PasseriformesFamily: Passeridae

Old World sparrows are small passerine birds. In general, sparrows tend to be small plump brownish or grayish birds with short tails and short powerful beaks. Sparrows are seed eaters, but they also consume small insects.

House sparrow, Passer domesticus (I)

Wagtails and pipits
Order: PasseriformesFamily: Motacillidae

Motacillidae is a family of small passerine birds with medium to long tails. They include the wagtails, longclaws, and pipits. They are slender, ground-feeding insectivores of open country.

American pipit, Anthus rubescens

Finches, euphonias, and allies
Order: PasseriformesFamily: Fringillidae

Finches are seed-eating passerines. They are small to moderately large and have strong, usually conical and sometimes very large, beaks. All have twelve tail feathers and nine primaries. They have a bouncing flight with alternating bouts of flapping and gliding on closed wings, and most sing well.

American goldfinch, Spinus tristis

Longspurs and snow buntings
Order: PasseriformesFamily: Calcariidae

The Calcariidae are a group of passerine birds that had traditionally been grouped with the New World sparrows, but differ in a number of respects and are usually found in open grassy areas.

Lapland longspur, Calcarius lapponicus (A)
Smith's longspur, Calcarius pictus (A)
Chestnut-collared longspur, Calcarius ornatus (A)
Snow bunting, Plectrophenax nivalis (A)

New World sparrows

Order: PasseriformesFamily: Passerellidae

Until 2017, these species were considered part of the family Emberizidae. Most of the species are known as sparrows, but these birds are not closely related to the Old World sparrows which are in the family Passeridae. Many of these have distinctive head patterns.

Grasshopper sparrow, Ammodramus savannarum
Savannah sparrow, Passerculus sandwichensis

Spindalises
Order: PasseriformesFamily: Spindalidae

The members of this small family, newly recognized in 2017, are native to the Greater Antilles. One species occurs fairly frequently in Florida.

Western spindalis, Spindalis zena (A)

Troupials and allies

Order: PasseriformesFamily: Icteridae

The icterids are a group of small to medium-sized, often colorful, passerines restricted to the New World, including the grackles, New World blackbirds and New World orioles. Most have black as a predominant plumage color, often enlivened by yellow, orange or red.

Bobolink, Dolichonyx oryzivorus
Orchard oriole, Icterus spurius
Baltimore oriole, Icterus galbula
Red-winged blackbird, Agelaius phoeniceus
Brown-headed cowbird, Molothrus ater
Common grackle, Quiscalus quiscula
Boat-tailed grackle, Quiscalus major

New World warblers

Order: PasseriformesFamily: Parulidae

The wood warblers are a group of small, often colorful, passerines restricted to the New World. Most are arboreal, but some are terrestrial. Most members of this family are insectivores.

Ovenbird, Seiurus aurocapilla
Worm-eating warbler, Helmitheros vermivorum
Northern waterthrush, Parkesia noveboracensis
Black-and-white warbler, Mniotilta varia
Orange-crowned warbler, Leiothlypis celata
Common yellowthroat, Geothlypis trichas
American redstart, Setophaga ruticilla
Cape May warbler, Setophaga tigrina
Northern parula, Setophaga americana
Magnolia warbler, Setophaga magnolia
Bay-breasted warbler, Setophaga castanea
Yellow warbler, Setophaga petechia
Blackpoll warbler, Setophaga striata
Black-throated blue warbler, Setophaga caerulescens
Palm warbler, Setophaga palmarum
Yellow-rumped warbler, Setophaga coronata
Yellow-throated warbler, Setophaga dominica
Prairie warbler, Setophaga discolor
Black-throated gray warbler, Setophaga nigrescens (A)
Black-throated green warbler, Setophaga virens

Cardinals and allies

Order: PasseriformesFamily: Cardinalidae

The cardinals are a family of robust, seed-eating birds with strong bills. They are typically associated with open woodland. The sexes usually have distinct plumages.

Western tanager, Piranga ludoviciana
Northern cardinal, Cardinalis cardinalis
Indigo bunting, Passerina cyanea
Painted bunting, Passerina ciris
Dickcissel, Spiza americana

See also
List of birds of Florida
List of birds of Everglades National Park
List of North American birds

References

External links
Florida Ornithological Society
Pictures of birds of Florida

Birds, Biscayne National Park
Florida, Biscayne
Biscayne National Park